Eternal Equinox is an album by the Gerald Wilson Orchestra recorded in 1969 which became his last released on the Pacific Jazz label.

Reception

AllMusic rated the album with 4½ stars.

Track listing 
All compositions by Gerald Wilson except as indicated
 "Equinox" (John Coltrane) – 4:55
 "Aquarius" (Galt MacDermot, Gerome Ragni, James Rado) – 3:01
 "Pisces" – 4:05
 "Scorpio Rising" – 4:35
 "Celestial Soul" – 4:19
 "Baby, Baby Don't Cry" (Al Cleveland, Terry Johnson, Smokey Robinson) – 3:00
 "Yes, Me and Now" – 3:54
 "Bluesnee" – 5:28
Recorded at Liberty Studios in Hollywood, CA on June 2, 1969 (tracks 1, 2 & 5) and June 3, 1969 (tracks 3 & 6–8).

Personnel 
Gerald Wilson – arranger, conductor
Jay Daversa (tracks 1–3 & 5–8), Paul Hubinon, Larry McGuire, William Peterson (track 4), Tony Rusch (track 4) – trumpet
Thurman Green, Lester Robinson (tracks 1–3 & 5–8), Frank Strong – trombone
Alexander Thomas (tracks 1–3 & 5–8), Mike Wimberly (track 4) – bass trombone
Arthur Maebe – French horn (tracks 1–3 & 5–8)
William Green – flute, piccolo (tracks 1–3 & 5–8)
Anthony Ortega – alto saxophone, flute
Henry DeVega (tracks 1–3 & 5–8), Bud Shank (track 4) – alto saxophone 
Hadley Caliman, Harold Land – tenor saxophone (tracks 1–3 & 5–8) 
Ernie Watts – tenor saxophone, flute, piccolo (tracks 1–3 & 5–8) 
Richard Aplanalp – baritone saxophone
Bobby Hutcherson – vibraphone (tracks 1–3 & 5–8) 
George Duke – piano
Richard "Groove" Holmes – organ (tracks 1–3 & 5–8) 
Jean-Luc Ponty – violin (track 4)
Wilbert Longmire – guitar (track 4)
Bob West – electric bass
Paul Humphrey (track 4), Carl Lott (tracks 1–3 & 5–8) – drums
William Marshall – vocals (track 6)

References 

Gerald Wilson albums
1969 albums
Pacific Jazz Records albums
Albums arranged by Gerald Wilson
Albums conducted by Gerald Wilson